Yvonne Chia (born c. 1953) is a Malaysian businesswoman and banker. She was the first woman in Malaysia to be the chief executive officer of a bank. She was the CEO of Hong Leong Bank. She is currently the CEO of Shell Refining Company in Malaysia.

Career

She started working for Bank of America in the 1970s. She became Vice President of the Malaysian Bank of America and head of its marketing division. She left after working there for 18 years. She was awarded the CEO Eagle Pin, becoming the first woman in Malaysia to be awarded it. Chia became the first woman to serve as chief executive officer of a bank in Malaysia when she became CEO of RHB Bank in the 1990s. She became the CEO of Hong Leong Bank in 2003 or 2004. In 2013, she was named one of Forbes Asia's "50 Businesswomen In The Mix".

References

Living people
Malaysian bankers
Malaysian people of Chinese descent
Malaysian chief executives
Malaysian women in business
Year of birth missing (living people)